Paparazzi Lightning is a second studio album by Ghostland Observatory released in January 2006 under Trashy Moped Recordings.

Track listing

Reception

External links

References

2006 albums
Ghostland Observatory albums